Hesperobaenus is a genus of beetles in the family Monotomidae, containing the following species:

 Hesperobaenus abbreviatus (Motschulsky, 1845)
 Hesperobaenus alternatus Schaeffer, 1910
 Hesperobaenus constricticollis Bousquet, 2002
 Hesperobaenus fenyesi Van Dyke, 1945
 Hesperobaenus humeralis (Fairmaire, 1850)
 Hesperobaenus lineellus (Reitter, 1872)
 Hesperobaenus rufipes LeConte, 1863
 Hesperobaenus stipes Sharp, 1900
 Hesperobaenus subtestaceus (Reitter, 1876)
 Hesperobaenus unicolor (Casey, 1916)

References

Monotomidae
Cucujoidea genera